Antónia Gertrudes Pusich (1 October 1805 – 6 October 1883) was a Portuguese poet, dramaturgist, journalist, pianist and composer.

Biography
She was born on the Island of São Nicolau, which used to be part of Portuguese Cape Verde. Daughter of the archipelago's colonial governor António Pusich who was born in Dubrovnik, Croatia (then Ragusa which belonged to the Republic of Ragusa) and Ana Maria Isabel Nunes. She married João Cardoso de Almeida Amado Viana Coelho in 1820 and had six children: João António, Antónia, Alfredo, Maria, Ana and Ema. She later married Francisco Teixeira Henriques and had only one son, 
Miguel Pusich Henriques Teixeira. She later married José Roberto de Melo Fernandes e Almeida in 1836 and had four sons, António Pusich de Melo, Antónia Pusich de Melo, Ana Isabel Filomena Pusich de Melo e Maria Amélia Pusich de Melo.

As a poet, she marked a novelistic influence in Portugal. and dared to use her real name, not a pseudonym which was custom at the time.

She was the first mother in Portugal that founded and headed a journal.

She took part in several periodicals including Paquete do Tejo (Package from Tejo). Revista universal lisbonense : jornal dos interesses physicos, moraes e litterarios por uma sociedade estudiosa, and Almanach (Modern Portuguese: Almanaco), having been director and owner of periodicals A assemblea literaria [Literary Assembly, Modern Portuguese: A assembleia literária], A Beneficiência and A Cruzada.

Legacy
A street is named for Pusich in the neighbourhood of Alvalade, in the city of Lisbon, Portugal. Streets are also named for her in the subdivision of Fetal, Charneca de Caparica in Almada and in Pinhal General in Fernão Ferro in Seixal.

Works
Source:
Olinda ou a Abadia de Cumnor Place [Olinda or Abbot of Cumnor Place] (poem)
Irminio e Edgarde, ou doys mistérios [Irminio and Edgarde and Two Mysteries] (novel)
O Regedor da Paróquia (drama/theatre) (drama/teatro)
Constança ou o Amor Maternal (Constance of the Maternal Love) (drama/theatre)
Saudade em memoria da virtuosa Rainha a senhora D. Estephania (Health in Memory of the Virtuous Queen Mme. D. Estefánia)
Canto saudoso ou lamentos na solidão á memoria do Dom Pedro Quinto
Biographia do marechal A. Pusich (Biography of Marshal A. Pusich, Modern Portuguese: Biografia do marechal A. Pusich)
Homenagem a Luís de Camões (Hommage to Luís de Camões)
Poesia a S. M. El-Rey Fidelissimo o Sr. D. Fernando no seu dia natalicio no anno de 1848
Homenagem a Sua Magestade a Rainha de Portugal Dona Estephania (Modern Portuguese: Homenagem a Sua Magestade a Rainha de Portugal Dona Estefánia)
Galeria das senhoras na Câmara dos senhores deputados, ou as minhas observações
Elegia à morte das infelizes victimas assassinadas por Francisco de Mattos Lobo, na noute de 25 de Julho de 1841
Elegia à morte de D. Marianna de Sousa Holstein (Elegy on the Death of D. Marianna de Sousa Holstein)
Elegia à Morte da Duqueza de Palmella (Modern Portuguese: Elegia a Morte da Duqueza de Palmela, Elegy on the Death of the Duchess of Palmela)
O Sonho ou os gemidos das classes inactivas
Preces ou Cântico Devoto dedicado aos Fiéis Portugueses
Lamentos à saudosa memoria de d. Maria Henriqueta do Casal Ribeiro
Parabéns a Sua Magestade o Senhor D. Fernando pelo consorcio de Sua Augusta Filha a Princeza D. Marianna
Apontamentos biographicos e poesia, sobre o infeliz José Pedro de Senna, capitão do brigue Marianna, naufragado em Aveiro
A conquista de Túnis (The Conquest of Tunis) [4]
Júlia
À minha pátria, memoria sobre um ramo de agricultura e commercio

References

Further reading
Pusich, Antónia Gertrudes (1805–83) in "Grande Enciclopédia Universal" Vol. 16, Edita Durclub, S.A.

External links
Antónia Pusich at Infopedia
Homenagem a Sua Magestade a Rainha de Portugal Dona Estephania, digital work 
In memoriam to the curated Antonià Gertrudes Pusich 
 Portrait of Antónia Pusich for Sinta Barbara in the magazine O Ocidente (The Western) at Hemeroteca Digital 

1805 births
1883 deaths
People from São Nicolau, Cape Verde
19th-century Portuguese poets
19th-century Portuguese dramatists and playwrights
Portuguese journalists
Portuguese pianists
Portuguese composers
Portuguese people of Croatian descent
Portuguese women poets
Portuguese women dramatists and playwrights
19th-century Portuguese women writers